The Cawcot River is a tributary of Gabriel Lake, flowing into the municipality of Baie-James, Jamésie, in the administrative region of Nord-du-Québec, Quebec, Canada.

This river crosses successively the cantons of Chambalon, Beaucours, Crisafy. Forestry is the main economic activity of the sector; recreational tourism activities, second. A logging camp has been established on the west bank of Lake Ventadour near the forest road.

The south of the Cawcot River Valley is served by route 212 which connects Obedjiwan to La Tuque and passes south of Lake Dubois. From there, the forest road R1032 (North–south direction) passes over the strip of land between the Queue de Castor River and the Ventadour River.

The surface of the Cawcot River is usually frozen from early November to mid-May, however, safe ice movement is generally from mid-November to mid-April.

Geography

Toponymy 
At various times in history, this territory has been occupied by the Attikameks, the Algonquins and the Crees. The term "Cawcot" is a first name of English origin.

The toponym "Cawcot River" was formalized on December 5, 1968, at the Commission de toponymie du Québec, when it was created.

Notes and references

See also 

Rivers of Nord-du-Québec
Jamésie
Nottaway River drainage basin